Marcus Nispel (born 26 May 1963) is a German film director and producer, Fulbright Scholar, best known for several high-profile American remakes such as The Texas Chainsaw Massacre, as well as an extensive career in television commercials and music videos. He started a production company, Portfolio Artists Network which later merged with RSA (Ridley Scott Associates) Black Dog Films to form Portfolio/Black Dog. He worked at RSA as a commercial director for several years.

Early life and career
Nispel was born on 26 May 1963 in Frankfurt. He grew up near McNair Barracks and was able to learn English from hanging out with children of soldiers. At the age of 15, he got a job at a boutique called Hessler and Kehrer. When he had his first interview at an American ad agency, he was asked what do Oreos mean, and he realized the importance of understanding American culture, and how working in advertising helped him understand that. He received a Fulbright Scholarship at the age of 20 and attended Brooklyn College and New York Institute of Technology. He was also an art director for Young & Rubicam.

Feature career
Nispel was set to make his feature directorial debut with End of Days, but stepped down before shooting due to issues with the budget. In 2002, Nispel signed on to direct The Texas Chainsaw Massacre. He was initially opposed to remaking the film, but Daniel Pearl, the cinematographer for the original film and regular collaborator with Nispel, convinced him to direct. The film was released on October 17, 2003 to negative reviews but was financially successful, grossing $107 million worldwide.

After directing The Texas Chainsaw Massacre, Nispel signed on to direct a psychological thriller called Need, starring Diane Lane. He picked the film as he wanted something 'diametrically opposed to TCM', but it was never released. Throughout the 2000s and into the 2010s, Nispel would direct several more remakes of prominent genre films, such as Friday the 13th (reuniting him with Platinum Dunes, who made Texas Chainsaw) and Conan the Barbarian. In 2015, Nispel directed the ghost exorcism film Exeter, formerly titled Backmask.

Personal life
He is married to singer/songwriter/commercial editor Dyan Humes-Nispel, who has written songs for various artists including Whitney Houston. They have two children.

In a 2021 interview, Nispel announced he had retired from film directing, becoming a property developer.

Filmography
Film

Trailers
 "Regenerate", a teaser trailer for Resident Evil: Apocalypse (2004).

Videography

1990 
 Al B. Sure! – "Had Enuf"
 Curtis Mayfield featuring Ice-T – "Superfly 1990"
 Olé Olé – "Love crusaders"
 Olé Olé – "How Can I Believe You"

1991
 C+C Music Factory – "Gonna Make You Sweat (Everybody Dance Now)"
 C+C Music Factory – "Things That Make You Go Hmmm..."
 C+C Music Factory – "Here We Go (Let's Rock & Roll)"
 Divinyls – "Love School"
 Inner City – "Till We Meet Again"
 Joe Jackson – "Obvious Song"
 Lisa Lisa and Cult Jam – "Let the Beat Hit 'Em"
 LL Cool J - "6 Minutes of Pleasure"
 Mantronix – "Don't Go Messin' with My Heart"
 Mariah Carey – "Make It Happen"
 Nia Peeples - "Street of Dreams"

1992
 Faith No More – "A Small Victory"
 Lisa Stansfield – "Someday (I'm Coming Back)"
 Martha Wash – "Give It to You"
 Trey Lorenz – "Photograph of Mary"

1993
 George Michael – "Killer/Papa Was A Rollin' Stone"
 The B-52's – "Good Stuff"
 Billy Joel – "Lullabye (Goodnight, My Angel)"
 Eternal – "Stay"
 Hi-Five – "Unconditional Love"
 Pauline Henry – "Feel Like Makin' Love"
 Hi-Five – "Never Should've Let You Go"
 Go West – "Tracks of My Tears"

1994
 All-4-One – "I Swear"
 Crystal Waters – "100% Pure Love"
 Fu-Schnickens – "Breakdown"
 Gloria Estefan – "Turn the Beat Around"
 Amy Grant – "House of Love"
 Jade – "Every Day of the Week"
 Tevin Campbell – "I'm Ready"
 Wet Wet Wet – "Love Is All Around"

1995
 Bette Midler – "To Deserve You"
 Janet Jackson – "Runaway"
 Mylène Farmer – "XXL"
 Mylène Farmer – "L'Instant X"
 Elton John – "Believe"
 No Doubt – "Spiderwebs"

1996
Scorpions – "You and I"
Fugees – "Ready or Not"
Lil' Kim featuring Puff Daddy – "No Time"
Mylène Farmer – "Comme j'ai mal"
Luis Miguel – "Dame"
Herbert Grönemeyer – "Bochum (Live)"

1997
 Elton John – "Recover Your Soul"
 Spice Girls – "Spice Up Your Life"
 Bush – "Greedy Fly"

1998
 Puff Daddy & The Family featuring The Notorious B.I.G. and Busta Rhymes – "Victory"
 Sunz of Man featuring Ol' Dirty Bastard and Earth, Wind & Fire – "Shining Star"
 Bryan Adams featuring Melanie C – "When You're Gone"

1999
 Terror Squad – "Whatcha Gon' Do"
 Mylène Farmer – "Souviens-toi du jour"
 Bryan Adams – "Cloud Number Nine"
 Nobody's Angel – "If You Wanna Dance"
 Paradise Lost - "So Much is Lost"

2000 
 The Mighty Mighty Bosstones – "So Sad to Say"
 Ronan Keating – "Life Is a Rollercoaster"

2001 
 The Charlatans – "Love Is the Key"

2006 
 Kyosuke Himuro – "Sweet Revolution"

References

External links
 

 The Hollywood Reporter
 Marcus Nispel at the Music Video Database

Year of birth missing (living people)
Mass media people from Frankfurt
German music video directors
Television commercial directors
German art directors
Horror film directors
Living people
Fulbright alumni